Broken Hill South Limited was an Australian silver, lead and zinc mining company with mines at Broken Hill, New South Wales.

It is not to be confused with Broken Hill South Blocks Ltd, which was acquired by Lakeview Consols in 1905 and Zinc Corporation (later Consolidated Zinc) in 1911.

History
In September 1885 a prospectus was issued for the formation of a company called Broken Hill South Silver Mining Company Limited with paid-up capital of £100,000 and rights to purchase Mineral Lease blocks 5, 6, 7, and 8, totalling  adjacent BHP's celebrated property, their intention being to exploit them sequentially. (Bartels, Kelly, Johnson, S. A. Stephen MLA, Weston) but was fully subscribed a week earlier.

Broken Hill South Silver Mining Company (No Liability) was registered in 1893.

They had leases on Blocks 7 and 8, a total of  along the line of lode, adjacent the  Zinc Corporation's lease.

The company was liquidated 1918 in order to be re-formed as Broken Hill South Limited.
By the end of 1939 over 10 million tons of ore had been extracted, refined and the concentrate sent to Broken Hill Associated Smelters at Port Pirie, South Australia.

The company had its head office in Melbourne. Two significant executives may be mentioned, W. E. Wainwright and Andrew Fairweather, each being mine manager at "The Hill" before becoming General Manager of the company.

References 

Mining companies of Australia
1885 establishments in Australia